USS Quest is a name used more than once by the U.S. Navy for its vessels:

 , built in 1916 by the Greenport Basin and Drydock Co., Long Island, New York
 , laid down 24 November 1943 by Gulf Shipbuilding Co., Chickasaw, Alabama

References 

United States Navy ship names